Amer Al Dossari (Arabic: عامر الدوسري) (born 2 March 1984) is a Qatari footballer.

External links
 

Qatari footballers
1977 births
Living people
Al-Sailiya SC players
Al Ahli SC (Doha) players
Qatar international footballers
Al-Gharafa SC players
Qatar SC players
El Jaish SC players
Al-Arabi SC (Qatar) players
Al-Markhiya SC players
Qatar Stars League players
Qatari Second Division players
Association football goalkeepers